The Battle of Albert may refer to:
Battle of Albert (1914), an encounter battle during the Race to the Sea
Battle of Albert (1916), the opening phase of the Battle of the Somme
Battle of Albert (1918), the opening phase of the Second Battle of the Somme